Van Horne is a Dutch surname.

List of people with the given name 
 Archibald Van Horne (c. 1758–1817), American politician
 Charles Van Horne (1921–2003), Canadian politician
 Dave Van Horne, American baseball announcer
 Espy Van Horne (1795–1829), U.S. Representative from Pennsylvania
 Harriet Van Horne (1920–1998), American newspaper columnist and film/television critic
 Heidi Van Horne, American actress and model
 Herman van Horne (died 1156), Dutch bishop
 Isaac Van Horne (1754–1834), U.S. Representative from Pennsylvania
 Jim Van Horne (born 1950), Canadian sports anchor
 Johannes Van Horne, physician and anatomist
 Keith Van Horne (born 1957), American football player in the National Football League
 Randy Van Horne (1924–2007), American singer and Flintstones theme song creator
 Robert Van Horne (born 1948), American composer and concert pianist
 Robert Van Horne (American football), American football coach
 Ron Van Horne (born 1932), Canadian politician
 Terry Van Horne (1946–2012), American politician
 William Cornelius Van Horne (1843–1915), Canadian railway executive

Fictional characters 

 Melvin Van Horne, the real name of Sideshow Mel in The Simpsons
 Daryl Van Horne, the main antagonist of the 1987 fantasy-comedy The Witches of Eastwick (film). Played by Jack Nicholson.

Surnames
Dutch-language surnames
Surnames of Dutch origin